Peaceful, the World Lays Me Down is the debut album by the English band Noah and the Whale. It was released on 11 August 2008 in the United Kingdom, and on 16 September 2008 in the United States. The band has since become very popular, especially in the U.K., in spite of the record receiving mixed or average reviews. An online campaign for the release of the album onto vinyl was set up in 2014.

Singles 
The first single was "5 Years Time," which was released in 2007.
The second single was "2 Bodies 1 Heart," which was released in 2008 but not included on the album. However, the video was released on the deluxe edition of the album.
The third single was "Shape of My Heart," which was released on 5 May 2008. It was their first single to chart, reaching 94 in the UK and spending 1 week on the chart.
The fourth single was the re-release of their debut single "5 Years Time." After the re-release on 4 August 2008, the song debuted at number 24 in the UK. It has, so far, achieved a peak position of 7 and has spent 15 weeks on the chart. In Ireland it debuted at number 47 and has, so far, achieved a peak position of 10 during its 6 weeks on the chart. "5 Years Time" is their highest charted song so far.
The fifth single was a re-release of their third single "Shape of My Heart". It was released on 20 October 2008.

Track listing 
All songs written by Charlie Fink.

Standard Edition
 "2 Atoms in a Molecule" – 2:05
 "Jocasta" – 2:49
 "Shape of My Heart" – 2:54
 "Do What You Do" – 4:17
 "Give a Little Love" – 4:15
 "Second Lover" – 4:04
 "5 Years Time" – 3:35
 "Rocks and Daggers" – 4:33
 "Peaceful, the World Lays Me Down" – 6:15
 "Mary" – 3:28
 "Hold My Hand as I'm Lowered" – 3:46

Deluxe Edition
This is the track listing of the deluxe edition (According to iTunes) :

All 11 tracks of standard edition +
"Shape of My Heart" (Music Video)
"2 Bodies 1 Heart" (Music Video)
"5 Years Time" (Music Video)

Chart performance 
In the UK it debuted at 5, which is its current peak position. It then dropped 2 places to 7 the following week, then another 8 places to 15 the following week, and 3 places to 18 the week after.

In Ireland it debuted at 32, which is its current peak position, it then dropped 8 places to 40 the next week, the following week it dropped 16 places to 56, and the next week it rose 19 places to 37.

Their song, "Give a Little Love" was used in an episode of Cougar Town titled "Here Comes My Girl" which first aired on 25 November 2009.

References

2008 debut albums
Vertigo Records albums
Noah and the Whale albums